is a Prefectural Natural Park in southeast Yamagata Prefecture, Japan. Established in 1961, the park spans the borders of the municipalities of Nan'yō and Takahata.

See also
 National Parks of Japan

References

Parks and gardens in Yamagata Prefecture
Nan'yō, Yamagata
Takahata, Yamagata
Protected areas established in 1961
1961 establishments in Japan